Clovis Brunel was a French philologist and writer.

Selected works 
 Les miracles de saint Privat. Suivis des Opuscules d'Aldebert III, évêque de Mende, Paris, A. Picard, 1912
 éd. de Bertran de Marseille, La vie de sainte Énimie. Poème provençal du XIIIe, Paris, H. Champion, 1916
 éd. de La Fille du comte de Ponthieu, nouvelle du XIIIe, Paris, H. Champion, 1926
 éd. de Les plus anciennes chartes en langue provençale. Recueil des pièces originales antérieures au XIIIe., Paris, Picard, 1926-1952
 éd. de Recueil des actes des comtes de Pontieu (1026-1279), Paris, Imprimerie nationale, 1930
 Bibliographie des manuscrits littéraires en ancien provençal, Liège, G. Thone ; Paris : E. Droz, 1935
 éd. de Jaufré. Roman arthurien du XIIIe en vers provençaux, Paris, Société des anciens textes français, 1943
 " Vida e miracles de Sancta Flor ", Analecta Bollandiana, 64, 1946, .
 Dir. de l'éd. de Recueil des actes de Philippe-Auguste, roi de France, Paris, Imprimerie nationale, 1916-...
 éd. de Recettes médicales, alchimiques et astrologiques du XVe en langue vulgaire des Pyrénées, Toulouse, E. Privat, 1956

References

People from Amiens
1884 births
1971 deaths
École Nationale des Chartes alumni
Academic staff of the École pratique des hautes études
Romance philologists
French philologists
French medievalists
Members of the Académie des Inscriptions et Belles-Lettres
Members of the Institute for Catalan Studies
20th-century French historians
Officiers of the Légion d'honneur
French male non-fiction writers
20th-century French male writers
20th-century philologists